Gabriel Ricardo Escobar Flores (born 4 April 2000) is a Salvadoran professional footballer.

Early life
Born in Santa Ana, El Salvador, Escobar moved to Vancouver, Canada, at age six. He began playing football with TSS FC Rovers immediately upon arrival in Canada, later joining Cliff Avenue United and the Vancouver Whitecaps Academy.

He played at the amateur adult level with FC Tigers Vancouver.

Club career
In 2022, he joined TSS FC Rovers in League1 British Columbia, being named to the L1BC Team of the Week five times and helping the Rovers win the championship final.

In August 2022, he signed a contract for the remainder of the 2022 season, with club options for 2023 and 2024, with HFX Wanderers FC of the Canadian Premier League.

International career
In 2014, he was called up by the Canada under-15 team to take part in a training camp. In 2016, he played for the Canada under-17 team in two friendly matches against the United States and was later called-up for matches against Panama and Jamaica. He was nominated for 2016 Canadian U17 Player of the Year, finishing in the top three in voting behind winner Alphonso Davies and Jonathan David.

In 2018, he was called up to the El Salvador under-20 team for the 2018 CONCACAF U-20 Championship, playing in three matches and cap-tying him to El Salvador.

References

External links

2000 births
Living people
Association football defenders
Salvadoran footballers
El Salvador youth international footballers
Canadian soccer players
Canada men's youth international soccer players
Salvadoran emigrants to Canada
Canadian people of Salvadoran descent
League1 British Columbia players
Canadian Premier League players
TSS FC Rovers players
Vancouver Whitecaps Residency players
HFX Wanderers FC players